Gale is a surname. Notable people with the surname include:

 Andrew Gale (born 1983), British cricketer
 Anthony Gale (died 1843), fourth commandant of the United States Marine Corps
 Bob Gale (born 1951), motion picture screenwriter
 Bob Gale (cricketer) (1933–2018), English cricketer
 Brendon Gale (born 1968), Australian rules footballer
 Colin Gale (1932–2008), Welsh footballer
 David Gale (1921–2008), mathematician
 David Gale (actor) (1936–1991), British actor
 Eddie Gale (1941–2020), American trumpeter
 Eddra Gale (1921–2001), American actress and singer
 Eric Gale (1938–1994), American jazz and session guitarist
 Ernest Gale (1914–2005), British microbiologist
 Fay Gale (1932–2008), Australian cultural geographer and professor
 Frederick Gale (1823–1904), English cricket writer and cricketer 
 George Gale (disambiguation)
 Gladys Gale (1891–1948), American nightclub singer, vaudeville performer, and character actress 
 Grant O. Gale (1903–1998), physics professor
 Hannah Gale (1876–1970), Canadian politician
 Henry Gale (astrophysicist) (1874–1942), American astrophysicist and author
 Henry Gale (British Army officer) (1883–1944), British Army officer
 Humfrey Gale (1890–1971), British Army lieutenant general
 Iain Gale (born 1959), British author
 John Gale (disambiguation)
 Joseph Gale (1807–1881), American pioneer
 Joseph H. Gale (born 1953), American judge
 Kate Gale (born 1965), American poet, librettist, and independent publisher
 Kelly Gale (born 1995), Australian Swedish Indian model 
 Laddie Gale (1917–1996), American basketball player
 Levin Gale (1784–1834), American politician
 Lorena Gale (1958–2009), Canadian actress
 Margaret Gale (born 1930), British operatic soprano
 Mariah Gale (born 1980), British-Australian actress
 Maura Gale, American voice actress
 Megan Gale (born 1975), Australian model
 Melvyn Gale (born 1952), cellist for the Electric Light Orchestra
 Michael Gale (footballer) (born 1966), former Australian rules football player
 Michael Gale (businessperson) (born 1962), Australian-American businessperson, son of Fay Gale
 Michael Denis Gale (1943–2009), British plant geneticist
 Mitchell Gale (born 1990), American football player
 Nathan Gale (1979–2004), American murderer
 Norman Gale (1862–1942), poet
 Parnell Gale (died 1818), Mayor of Galway in 1817
 Patrick Gale (born 1962), British author
 Philip Gale, computer prodigy
 Philip A. Gale, British scientist
 Richard Gale (disambiguation)
 Robert Gale (disambiguation)
 Roger Gale (born 1943), English politician
 Shaun Gale (born 1969), English former footballer
 Shirley Gale (1915–2008), American botanist, botanical illustrator, and conservationist
 Terry Gale (born 1946), Australian golfer
 Theophilus Gale (1628–1678), English theologian
 Thomas Gale (c. 1630–1702), English classical scholar
 Tommy Gale (racing driver), former NASCAR Cup Series driver
 Tony Gale (born 1959), English football player and coach
 Tristan Gale (born 1980), American athlete
 Vi Gale (1917–2007), Swedish-born American poet and publisher
 Walter Frederick Gale (1865–1945), Australian banker and astronomer
 William Gale (disambiguation)
 Zona Gale (1874–1938), American writer

Fictional characters
 Cathy Gale, in the TV series The Avengers
 David Gale, from the video games Shin Megami Tensei: Digital Devil Saga
 Dorothy Gale, in the early 1900s L. Frank Baum Oz series and movies
 Uncle Henry (The Oz Books), Dorothy Gale's uncle
 Henry Gale (Ben Linus), in the television series Lost

See also
Gale (given name)
Gail (disambiguation)
Gayle (disambiguation)
Gale (disambiguation)

English-language surnames